Adreon is both a surname and a given name. Notable people with the name include:

Franklin Adreon (1902–1979), American film and television director, producer, screenwriter, and actor
Adreon Henry (born 1975), American artist and musician